Lloyds is an unincorporated community in Essex County, Virginia, United States.

Notable person
 Robert Henry Whitelaw, Missouri congressman (1890-1891) was born near Lloyds, Virginia, in 1854.

Notes

Unincorporated communities in Essex County, Virginia
Unincorporated communities in Virginia